This is a list of monuments that are classified by the Moroccan ministry of culture around Rabat.

Monuments and sites in Rabat 

|}

References 

Rabat
Rabat